Mordellistena hattorii is a beetle in the genus Mordellistena of the family Mordellidae. It was described in 1953 by Tokeji.

References

hattorii
Beetles described in 1953